The LOS40 Music Award for Best Urban Artist is an honor presented annually by Los 40 as part of the LOS40 Music Awards, which are considered Spain's most important music awards today.

It was introduced in 2019 as the Los40 Urban Award in the now-defunct Mixed Global category before being given its current name and added to the expanded Latin category.

Winners and nominees

References

Awards established in 2019